The Luxembourg Cup is the national ice hockey cup competition in Luxembourg. It has been known as the Alter Domus Cup since 2010. Prior to 2003, clubs from other countries in the region were allowed to participate in the tournament.

Champions
2018-19: Tornado Luxembourg
2016–17: Tornado Luxembourg
2015–16: Tornado Luxembourg
2014–15: Tornado Luxembourg
2013–14: Tornado Luxembourg
2012–13: Tornado Luxembourg
2011–12: Tornado Luxembourg
2010–11: Lokomotiv Luxembourg
2009–10: not held
2008–09: not held
2007–08: not held
2006–07: Tornado Luxembourg
2005–06: not held
2004–05: not held
2003–04: not held
2002–03: Tornado Luxembourg
2001–02:  EHC Zweibrucken 2
2000–01:  HC Amneville Moselle 2
1999–2000:  HC Amneville Moselle 2
1998–99: Tornado Luxembourg
1997–98:  IHC Leuven
1996–97: Tornado Luxembourg
1995–96: Tornado Luxembourg
1994–95:  IHC Leuven
1993–94: Tornado Luxembourg

References

 
Lux
Cup